Jefferson Lucas Azevedo dos Santos known as Lucas (born 25 October 1984) is a Brazilian footballer.

Biography
Born in Londrina, Paraná, Lucas played a match in 2004 Copa do Brasil for Londrina Esporte Clube, then transferred to Londrina Junior Team on 1 April 2004, an affiliated club of Londrina (later split and no connection).

In January 2005 he was loaned to Slovenian side Domžale, rejoining Jhonnes and Juninho. In September, he extended his contract with Londrina Junior Team until March 2009. He then left for Portuguese side Amarante of League of Porto district (fifth level in the pyramid).

He returned to Brazil and loaned to J. Malucelli in October 2006. He played 3 times for the club at 2006 Copa Paraná (on matchday 7 [sub], 8, and 9.)

He also played for the club at 2007 Campeonato Paranaense.

In July 2007, he was loaned to Portuguesa Londrinense. He played for the club at 2007 Copa Paraná.

In January 2008, he was loaned to União São João. He played the first 2 games of 2008 Campeonato Paulista Série A2 without a goal. In February, he left for Uniclinic of 2008 Campeonato Cearense. The team only collected four points in 18 games, finished as the last. He played seven out of nine games in the second half of the season, and played round 14 and 15 as unused bench.

In July, he left for Atlético Cambé. He played a few games in 2008 Campeonato Paranaense Third Division. The team finished as the last with two points.

In February 2009, he left for Romanian side Universitatea Craiova.

Career statistics

1 Unknown match in 2004 Campeonato Paranaense
2 3 matches in 2006 Copa Paraná
3 8+ matches and 2 goals in 2007 Campeonato Paranaense; line-up not known in round 6 and 14
4 13 matches and 2 goals in 2007 Copa Paraná
5 2 matches in 2008 Campeonato Paulista Série A2
6 7 matches in 2008 Campeonato Cearense
7 5+ games and 1 goal in 2008 Campeonato Paranaense Third Division; line-up not available for round 2

References

External links
 Futpedia 
 Stats from Slovenia at PrvaLiga 

Brazilian footballers
1984 births
Living people
Londrina Esporte Clube players
J. Malucelli Futebol players
União São João Esporte Clube players
NK Domžale players
Amarante F.C. players
Association football midfielders
Sportspeople from Londrina
Brazilian expatriate footballers
Expatriate footballers in Portugal
Brazilian expatriate sportspeople in Portugal
Expatriate footballers in Slovenia
Brazilian expatriate sportspeople in Slovenia
Expatriate footballers in Romania
Brazilian expatriate sportspeople in Romania